Tom Hughes (born 18 April 1985) is an English actor. He is best known for his roles as Prince Albert in the ITV drama Victoria (2016–2019) and Joe Lambe in the BBC drama The Game (2014), as well as Thomas Trafford in the BBC and Amazon Prime Video’s miniseries The English (2022).
His film roles include Cemetery Junction (2011), Red Joan (2018), The Laureate (2021), Madame (2017) and Shepherd (2021).

Early life
Hughes was born and brought up in Upton-by-Chester, Cheshire, the younger of two boys. He attended the Liverpool Everyman Youth Theatre group. He was a member of the Cheshire Youth Theatre and the Jigsaw Music Theatre Company. He graduated from the Royal Academy of Dramatic Art (RADA) in 2008 with a Bachelor of Arts in Acting. Hughes is the former guitarist of indie band Quaintways. His father Roy is a musician.

Career
Hughes began his career in 2009 as Dr Harry Ingrams in the BBC spin-off series Casualty 1909 and Jonty Millingden in the ITV drama Trinity. He made his feature film debut the following year as Chaz Jankel in the Ian Dury biopic Sex & Drugs & Rock & Roll and Bruce Pearson in the comedy-drama Cemetery Junction, the latter of which earned him a BIFA nomination for Most Promising Newcomer. He also appeared in the Young Vic production of David Harrower's Sweet Nothings directed by Luc Bondy.

In 2011, Hughes was named one of BAFTA's 42 Brits to Watch. He played pupil barrister Nick Slade in series 1 of the BBC One legal drama Silk, and appeared in the BBC television film Page Eight alongside Ralph Fiennes and Rachel Weisz. Hughes then appeared in the Richard II installment of the television anthology The Hollow Crown as Aumerle.

In 2013, he starred in the BFI/BBC film, based on the award-winning novel, 8 Minutes Idle as the lead role Dan Thomas. He made a guest appearance as Michael Rogers in an episode of Agatha Christie's Marple.

From 2016 to 2019, Hughes starred as Prince Albert opposite Jenna Coleman as the titular character of the ITV period drama Victoria. He starred in the 2019 film Red Joan alongside Judi Dench. In 2019, it was announced Hughes would play the recurring role of Christopher Marlowe in the second series of A Discovery of Witches.

Filmography

Film

Television

Awards and nominations

References

External links
 

1985 births
21st-century English male actors
Alumni of RADA
English male film actors
English male television actors
Living people
Actors from Chester
Male actors from Cheshire